Yad Eliyahu is a neighborhood in east Tel Aviv, Israel.

Yad Eliyahu was established in 1929. It developed in accordance with plans drawn up by Jacob Ben Sira, the Tel Aviv municipal engineer.  The neighborhood, named for Haganah leader Eliyahu Golomb, became the site of housing projects for ex-servicemen after World War II.

Menora Mivtachim Arena, home to the Maccabi Tel Aviv basketball team is located in Yad Eliyahu.

Notable residents
Dani Dayan
Ilana Dayan
Shulamit Lapid
Tommy Lapid
Yair Lapid
Yaakov Amidror
Moshe Maya
Anita Shapira

References

Neighborhoods of Tel Aviv